Fernando Ramírez can refer to:

Fernando Ramírez (Mexican athlete), a Mexican sprinter who competed in the 1932 Summer Olympics
Fernando Ramírez (Norwegian athlete), a retired athlete who represented Norway in several World Championships
Fernando Ramírez de Haro, 10th Marquis of Villanueva del Duero, a Spanish aristocrat
Fernando Ramírez de Haro, 16th Count of Bornos, a Spanish aristocrat

See also
Fernando Remírez de Estenoz, a Cuban politician